Scott Humphries and Mark Merklein were the defending champions but lost in the final 6–2, 6–4 against Todd Perry and Thomas Shimada.

Seeds

  Gastón Etlis /  André Sá (first round)
  Scott Humphries /  Mark Merklein (final)
  Nathan Healey /  Jordan Kerr (first round)
  Martín García /  Graydon Oliver (semifinals)

Draw

References
 2003 Brasil Open Doubles Draw

Doubles
Doubles